Night Passage may refer to:
Night Passage (film), a 1957 western film starring James Stewart and Audie Murphy
Night Passage (album), Weather Report's tenth album, released in 1980
Night Passage (opera), a 1994 work by Robert Moran
Night Passage (novel), one of the Jesse Stone novels written by Robert B. Parker
"Night Passage", a short story by Fritz Leiber